Bendu Apparao R.M.P is a 2009 Indian Telugu-language romantic comedy film written and directed by E V V Satyanarayana, and produced by D. Ramanaidu. The film Allari Naresh and Meghana Raj in lead roles with Kamna in supporting role. It has music composed by Koti.

The film was made on a budget of 3 crore and was released with 35 prints on 16 October 2009 in Andhra Pradesh. It opened to positive reviews. The film was successful at the box office.

Plot 
Bendu Appa Rao is an RMP doctor in a tiny village in East Godavari. Though he does not have much knowledge about medicines, he uses his brain to come out of critical situations. He earns money by all means as his sister faces torture in the hands of her husband, as he could not pay the entire dowry to him. He maintains close relations and friendship with everyone in the village, which include a barber, a tailor, a washer man and a postman.

Sagi Suryanarayana Raju is a landlord and Padma Priya is his only daughter. Padma falls in love with Appa Rao and the latter too loses his heart to her. Once, Appa Rao and his friends, while returning to village after watching a movie, find a grievously injured person called Sivaji. Before breathing his last, he pleads with Appa Rao to hand over Rs 15 lakh to his family. Despite lot of pressure from his friends to share the money among themselves, Appa Rao makes many efforts to hand over the money to Sivaji's kin.

On learning that Sivaji's parents are no more and sister had left the country after marrying a person, Appa Rao agrees to share the money between the tailor, barber and himself. He gives them Rs 2 lakh to each to settle their debts; he too takes a part of the money to settle his sister's life. He utilizes the balance amount to construct a school building in the village and names it after Sivaji. However, Appa Rao makes everyone believe that they got a prize in lottery.

Accidentally, Sivaji's parents and sister reach the village and Appa Rao learns the truth. He feels guilty as he had already spent the money. So, he mortgages his house to a local trader and spends it for the bypass surgery of Sivaji's father. He also promises to marry Sivaji's sister sacrificing his love with Padma. But on the day of marriage, the President of the village tells to Gayathri that Appa Rao killed Sivaji and robbed the Money and wants to marry Gayathri to avoid future legal problems. Gayathri believes it and Appa Rao is beaten severely. But Raju and the local trader reveal the truth and save Appa Rao. Padma is married to Appa Rao in the climax as Gaythri understands their love.

Cast 

 Allari Naresh as Bendu Appa Rao R.M.P
 Meghana Raj as Gayathri
 Krishna Bhagavaan as Appa Rao's brother-in-law
 Kamna as Padma
 Ahuti Prasad as Sagi Suryanarayana Raju, Padma's father
 Raghubabu as Soori Babu Raju's servant
 L.B. Sriram as Samaram (cock) feeder.
 Dharmavarapu Subramanyam as Mudhu Krishna [Donga Doctor]
 Suman Setty as Ganesh [compounder]
 Telangana Shakuntala as Padma's grandmother
 Srinivasa Reddy as Tailor
 Uttej as Barber
 Ali as Dubai Broker alias Dubai Seenu (Fraudster)
 Chalapathi Rao as Village sarpanch
 Kondavalasa Lakshmana Rao as Postman
 Ananth as Raju's permanent guest
 Ravi Prakash as Shivaji, Gayathri's brother
 Jeeva as money lender/sweet shop owner
 Ramya Chowdary as Tailor (Srinivasa Reddy)'s cousin (sister-in-law; "maradalu")

  D.Ramanaidu as Collector (cameo)

Soundtrack 
Soundtrack was composed by Koti. and Released on Aditya Music.

See also 
 Telugu films of 2009

References

External links 
 

2009 films
2009 romantic comedy films
Films directed by E. V. V. Satyanarayana
Films scored by Koti
Indian romantic comedy films
Suresh Productions films